Jackie Williams may refer to:

Salvatore Tripoli (1904–1990), American bantamweight boxer, also known as Jackie Williams
Jackie Williams (footballer, born 1929), footballer for Tranmere Rovers
Jackie Williams (footballer, born 1911) (1911–1979), footballer for Wales, Huddersfield Town and Aston Villa

See also
Jack Williams (disambiguation)